Boris Mijatović (born 4 February 1974 in Kassel) is a German politician of The Greens who has been serving as a member of the Bundestag since 2021, representing the Kassel district.

Life
Mijatović was born 1974 in the West German city of Kassel. Following his graduation from Jacob Grimm School in Kassel in 1993, Mijatović worked for a startup until 1998. In 2001, he completed his master’s degree in political science at the University of Kassel, where he subsequently worked as a research assistant.

Following his internship at the International Criminal Court in The Hague from 2005 to 2006, he was a freelance worker for victim research projects from 2005 to 2010.

Mijatović is married and lives in Kassel.

Politics
Mijatović joined the Green Party in 2004. He has been a city councillor of Kassel since 2011, first in the Committee for Integration and Sports and since 2016 for Youth Policy and Participation. From 2015 to 2019, he was district chairman of the Kassel Greens. Since 2018, Mijatović has been a member of the state executive committee of Hessen, and since 2019, he has been the parliamentary group chairman in Kassel.

From 2011 to 2017 he worked as advisor for Nicole Maisch, a member of the Bundestag, and from 2018 to 2021 for Martin Häusling, member of the European Parliament.

In 2021, as previously in 2017, Mijatović ran for the direct mandate in the Kassel constituency but lost to Timon Gremmels (SPD) with 17.3% (2017: 9.4%) of the vote.

In parliament, Mijatović has been serving on the Committee on the European Affairs and the Committee on Human Rights and Humanitarian Aid. In addition to his committee assignments, he is also part of the Inter-Parliamentary Alliance on China.

Other activities
 Centre for International Peace Operations (ZIF), Member of the Supervisory Board (since 2022)

References

External links
 Website of Boris Mijatović
 Biography at the German Bundestag

Living people
1974 births
Politicians from Kassel
Members of the Bundestag for Hesse
Members of the Bundestag 2021–2025
21st-century German politicians